Yoon Kyung-won (born 1 January 1982 in South Korea) is a Korean professional ice hockey defenceman. He is playing in his sixth year for Anyang Halla after returning from serving his 2 years military service.

References

1982 births
Living people
South Korean ice hockey defencemen
HL Anyang players
Asian Games medalists in ice hockey
Asian Games bronze medalists for South Korea
Ice hockey players at the 2007 Asian Winter Games
Medalists at the 2007 Asian Winter Games